Ships in service with the Hellenic Navy currently include frigates of the Hydra and Elli classes. In the late twentieth century the navy also used Knox-class frigates. Going back to the early nineteenth century, sailing ships such as the Hellas were in service.

Serving

Hydra (MEKO 200) class 

 F-452 Hydra (Ύδρα)
 F-453 Spetsai (Σπέτσαι)
 F-454 Psara (Ψαρά)
 F-455 Salamis (Σαλαμίς)

Elli (Kortenaer/Standard) class 

  F-450 Elli (Έλλη)
 F-451 Limnos (Λήμνος)
 F-459 Adrias (Αδριάς)
 F-460 Aigaion (Αιγαίον)
 F-461 Navarinon (Ναβαρίνον)
 F-462 Kountouriotis (Κουντουριώτης)
 F-464 Kanaris (Κανάρης)
 F-465 Themistoklis (Θεμιστοκλής)
 F-466 Nikiforos Fokas (Νικηφόρος Φωκάς)

Historical

Sail
 Hellas (1826-1831)

Knox class

 (1992-2002)
 (1992-2001)
 (1992-1998)

Elli class 
 F-463 Bouboulina (Μπουμπουλίνα) (2001-2013)

Hellenic